The year 1808 in science and technology involved some significant events, listed below.

Astronomy
 December 9 (20:34 UTC) – Mercury occults Saturn (not known at this time).

Chemistry
 Barium, calcium, magnesium, and strontium isolated by Humphry Davy.
 Joseph Louis Gay-Lussac formulates the law of combining volumes for gases.
 John Dalton begins publication of A New System of Chemical Philosophy, explaining his atomic theory of chemistry and including a list of atomic weights.
 Jöns Jakob Berzelius publishes Lärbok i Kemien in which he proposes modern chemical symbols and notation, and of the concept of relative atomic weight.

Mathematics
 French mathematician Christian Kramp introduces the notation n! in factorials.
 German mathematician Carl Friedrich Gauss publishes Theorematis arithmetici demonstratio nova, introducing Gauss's lemma in the third proof of quadratic reciprocity.
 Irish American mathematician Robert Adrain produces a formulation of the method of least squares.

Medicine
 The term "psychiatry" is first coined (as psychiatrie) by German physician Johann Christian Reil.
 The early medical journal Bibliotek for Læger begins publication in Denmark.

Natural history
 January 12 – Organizational meeting leading to creation of the Wernerian Natural History Society is held in Edinburgh.
 Alexander von Humboldt publishes his Ansichten der Natur.

Technology
 February 11 – Anthracite coal is first burned as fuel by Jesse Fell in Wilkes-Barre, Pennsylvania; the discovery leads to the use of coal as a key fuel source of the industrial revolution in the United States.
 August 24 – William Congreve patents the Congreve clock with a rolling ball regulator.
 Bryan Donkin patents a steel nib pen in England.
 John Heathcoat is granted his first patent for a bobbinet lace machine in England.

Awards
 Copley Medal: William Henry
 Joseph Louis Lagrange is appointed by Napoleon as a Grand Officer of the Legion of Honour and a Comte of the French Empire.

Births
 February 29 – Hugh Falconer, Scottish-born geologist, botanist, paleontologist and paleoanthropologist (died 1865).
 April 13 – Antonio Meucci, Italian-born inventor (died 1899).
 May 9 – John Scott Russell, Scottish-born naval architect and shipbuilder (died 1882).
 July 8 – George Robert Gray, English zoologist (died 1872).
 July 25 – Johann Benedict Listing, German mathematician (died 1882).
 August 4 – Johann Ritter von Oppolzer, Austrian physician (died 1871).
 October 29 – Caterina Scarpellini, Italian astronomer (died 1873).
 November 6 – Friedrich Julius Richelot, German mathematician (died 1875).
 Anne Elizabeth Ball, Irish phycologist (died 1872).

Deaths
 March 3 – Johan Christian Fabricius, Danish entomologist (born 1745).
 May 18 – Rev. Elijah Craig, American inventor of bourbon whiskey (birth date uncertain).
 October 8 – John Sheldon, English anatomist (born 1752).
 October 21 – Maria Christina Bruhn, Swedish inventor (born 1732).
 December 24 – Thomas Beddoes, reforming English physician (born 1760).

References

 
19th century in science
1800s in science